Harold Archer "Harry" Brown (16 September 1897 – 1958) was an English footballer who played as a centre forward for various clubs in the 1920s, including Sunderland and Queens Park Rangers.

References

1897 births
People from Shildon
Footballers from County Durham
1958 deaths
English footballers
Association football forwards
Shildon A.F.C. players
Sunderland A.F.C. players
Leadgate Park F.C. players
Chilton Colliery Recreation F.C. players
Queens Park Rangers F.C. players
English Football League players
Date of death missing